Greece and Lithuania are both full members of the Organization for Security and Co-operation in Europe, of NATO and the European Union.

Historical relations
Greece recognised the State of Lithuania on May 23, 1922, and diplomatic relations between the two countries were restored on January 7, 1992. Greece had never officially recognised the annexation of the Baltic states by the USSR. 
Lithuania has maintained an embassy in Athens since 1997 along with an honorary consulate in Thessaloniki. Greece has had an embassy in Vilnius since January 2, 2005.

List of bilateral visits 
 In February 1997, the President of Lithuania Algirdas Brazauskas visited Greece
 On July 2, 2007, the Lithuanian Ministry of Foreign Affairs Petras Vaitiekūnas visited Athens
 In September 2008, the Prime Minister of Lithuania Gediminas Kirkilas visited Athens

Bilateral agreements
 investment protection,
 culture, tourism, economic, industrial and technological cooperation,
 road and sea transport,
 mutual elimination of visas,
 re-admission of persons,
 protection of confidential information

Diplomacy

Republic of Greece
Vilnius (Embassy)

Republic of Lithuania
Athens (Embassy)

See also
Foreign relations of Greece
Foreign relations of Lithuania

References

External links
Greek Ministry of Foreign Affairs about the relation with Lithuania
 Lithuanian Ministry of Foreign Affairs: list of bilateral treaties with Greece 
 Lithuanian embassy in Athens 

 
Lithuania
Greece